Ray or Raymond Williams may refer to:

Sportspeople

Football (soccer)
Ray Williams (footballer, born 1930), English football player for Tranmere Rovers
Ray Williams (footballer, born 1931) (1931–2015), Welsh football player for Wrexham
Ray Williams (footballer, born 1946), English football player

Rugby
Ray Williams (rugby union, born 1927) (1927–2014), Welsh international rugby union winger 
Ray Williams (rugby union coach) (1927–2014), Welsh rugby union coach and administrator
Ray Williams (rugby league) (20th century), New Zealand rugby league player
Ray Williams (rugby union, born 1909) (1909–2001), New Zealand international rugby union winger

Other sports
Ray Williams (basketball) (1954–2013), basketball player
Ray Williams (weightlifter) (born 1959), Commonwealth gold medallist
Ray Williams (bowls) (1951–2016), Welsh lawn bowls player
 Ray Orlando Williams, American powerlifter

Other people
Raymond Williams (1921–1988), British academic
Ray Williams (businessman) (born 1937), founder of HIH Insurance (Australia)
Ray Williams (producer) (born 1947), music publicist
Ray Williams (politician) (born 1960), Australian politician
Ray Robinson Williams (1899–1987), South Carolina state senator, 1940–1953
Ray Williams (educator), director of education at the Blanton Museum of Art